Sefirin Kızı is a turkish drama television series directed by Emre Kabakuşak and written by Ayşe Ferda Eryılmaz and Sedef Nehir Erdem. It consists of two seasons, the first of which aired on 16 December 2019, and concluded on 22 June 2020. The second season premiered on September 7, 2020 and concluded on May 11, 2021. The series originally starred Engin Akyürek and Neslihan Atagül in the lead roles, but Atagül announced on 18 January 2021 that she would depart from the series due to leaky gut syndrome and was replaced by Tuba Büyüküstün.

Cast 
 Engin Akyürek as Sancar Efeoğlu
 Neslihan Atagül as Nare Çelebi Efeoğlu
 Tuba Büyüküstün as Mavi Çınar
 Beren Gençalp as Melek Efeoğlu
 Uraz Kaygılaroğlu as Gediz Işıklı
 Doğukan Polat as Yahya Efeoğlu
 Hivda Zizan Alp as Elvan Efeoğlu
 Cemre Öktem as Zehra Efeoğlu
 Zerrin Sümer as Feride Efeoğlu
 Edip Tepeli as Kavruk Ömer
 Gonca Cilasun as Halise Efeoğlu
 Özlem Çakar Yalçınkaya as Refika Şahin Işıklı
 Esra Kızıldoğan as Müge Işıklı
 Sami Aksu as Necdet Yılmaz
 Tülin Yazkan as Menekşe Yılmaz
 Nilüfer Kılıçarslan as Atike Yılmaz
 Yagmur Baskurt as Gülsiye
 İlayda Ildır as Dudu
 Duygu Karaca as Eşe
 Erdal Küçükkömürcü as Güven Çelebi
 Bülent Şakrak as Kahraman Boz
 Gözde Çığacı as Ceylan
 Erhan Alpay as Akın Baydar
 Deniz Işın s Sahra Yalçın
 Furkan Aksoy as Loki
 Ferit Aktuğ as Bora
 Şafak Başkaya as Sedat

Production 
The series was shot in Muğla and Montenegro.

The series was originally starring Neslihan Atagül and Engin Akyürek in the lead roles, But Atagül announced on 18 January 2021 that she would depart from the series due to leaky gut syndrome. Later, it was announced that Tuba Büyüküstün had replaced her.  It was also reported that Uraz Kaygılaroğlu would depart from the series after a few episodes. His role later ended in Episode 37.

Series overview

Awards and nominations

References

External links 
 
Sefirin Kizi, The Daughter of Ambassador in english Plot, episodes, Actors

2019 Turkish television series debuts
2021 Turkish television series endings
Turkish drama television series
Epic television series
Turkish-language television shows
Star TV (Turkey) original programming